Mount Svinjak is a  mountain in northwestern Slovenia in the Julian Alps. It stands east-northeast of Bovec.

The name of the mountain is derived from *Svitnjak 'shining one' (< svit 'dawn; light, shining') because it is illuminated by the rising sun when viewed from Bovec. The resemblance to the common noun svinjak (with various meanings: 'pigsty', 'pig dung'; 'cat's ear') is coincidental.

References

External links
 Mount Svinjak at Geopedia.si
 Point Svinjak (Peak). Pespoti.si. A map and general information about access and climbing to Mount Svinjak. 

Mountains of the Slovene Littoral
One-thousanders of Slovenia